Copa Newton was a football friendly competition contested between Argentina and Uruguay. The trophy, donated by Nicanor Newton, was contested 27 times between 1906 and 1976.

History 

Nicanor Newton, director of Sportsman magazine, donated the trophy for a competition which would be held for beneficial purposes. The competition (therefore named "Copa Newton") was first held in 1906, one year after the first edition of Copa Lipton, and was continued on an annual basis until 1930, with the exception of 1910, 1914, 1921, 1923 and 1925–1926.

It has only been played sporadically since, with just 8 editions played over four decades between 1937 and 1976.

The cup has been contested 28 times in total, with Argentina the winners on 17 occasions and Uruguay on 11.

List of champions

Finals
The following list includes all the editions of the Copa Newton:

Notes

Titles by country

All-time scorers
 Angel Romano 4
 Eliseo Brown 4
/ Alexander Watson Hutton 3
 Jose Piendibene 3
 O.Goicoechea 3
 Carlos Scarone 2
 Jorge Valdano 2

Most finals by player
8:  Angel Romano (won 4),  Cayetano Saporiti (won 3)
6:  Alfredo Foglino (won 5),  Pedro Calomino (won 2) 
5:  Carlos Tomás Wilson (won 4),  Eliseo Brown (won 4),  José Piendibene (won 3),  Carlos Scarone (won 3),  Hector Scarone (won 3),  Pablo Dacal (won 3),  Juan Domingo Brown (won 2),  Juan Carlos Bertone (won 1)
4:  Juan Enrique Hayes (won 2), 
3:  Jorge Brown (won 3),  Alfredo Brown (won 3),  Alexander Watson Hutton (won 2),  Pedro Petrone (won 1)

See also
 Copa Lipton
 Argentina–Uruguay football rivalry

References

n
n
n
n
n
n